Rheingrafenstein Castle is a castle on a  porphyry rock formation, the Rheingrafenstein, known as Huhinstein a thousand years, on the river Nahe, opposite Bad Münster am Stein-Ebernburg in the district Bad Kreuznach.

History 
The rock castle was probably built in the 11th or 12th century by the Counts of Nahegau of the Emichones family.  It was definitely the ancestral castle of the Lords of Stein, the later Wild- and Rhinegraves, and it remained in their possession until the French Revolution.  The Lords of Stein were first mentioned in the 12th century.  Their relationship to the Counts of Nahegau is unclear.  Rheingrafenstein Castle itself is first unambiguously mentioned in the 13th century.  The Lords of Stein acquired the Rheingau in the second half of the 12th century through marriage.  In 1196, Lord Wolfram of Stein began styling himself Rhinegrave.  This title was later attached to his castle.

During the Thirty Years' War, the castle was captured by French and Spanish troops.  In 1688, it was destroyed by general Mélac.  In 1721, a salt works was built on top of the castle's ruins.  The castle's last owner, the Prince of Grumbach, moved his residence to nearby Gaugrehweiler.

The information sign at the castle reads:

Ruins 
Parts of the enceinte, a vaulted cellar, a few steps of the former tower house, and the foundations of the former tower staircase are still standing.  Another staircase leads through the rocks to a viewing platform.

On the southern slope of the rock, the ruins of the bailey Affenstein can be seen.

References 
 Alexander Thon (ed.): Wie Schwalbennester an den Felsen geklebt. Burgen in der Nordpfalz, 1st ed., Schnell & Steiner, Regensburg, 2005, p. 130–135
 Alexander Thon and Marin Wenz: Rheingrafenstein, in: Jürgen Keddigkeit, Ulrich Burkhart and Rolf Übel (eds.): Pfälzisches Burgenlexikon, vol. 4/1, O-Sp, Kaiserslautern, 2007, p. 242-258

External links 
 Rheingrafenstein Castle at www.burgenspiegel.de
 Reconstructed drawing of the medieval situation

Castles in Rhineland-Palatinate
Heritage sites in Rhineland-Palatinate
Ruined castles in Germany
History of Rhineland-Palatinate
Buildings and structures in Bad Kreuznach (district)